Ujście  is a town in Piła County, Greater Poland Voivodeship, northwestern Poland, with 8,134 inhabitants (2011).

Although there was already a stronghold here in the 7th century, Ujście was founded in the 12th century. From that time until the end of the 18th century, until the Second Partition of Poland in 1793, the town was situated within the borders of the Polish state.

In 1920, the city was divided into two parts, village Deutsch Usch (smaller part, Germany) and town Ujście/Usch (greater part, Poland). In 1945, Ujście was completely within the borders of Poland, and then united into one town.

Shrine
There is Saint Nicholas Church with a Calvary reminding the Crucifixion of Jesus.

References

Cities and towns in Greater Poland Voivodeship
Piła County
Poznań Voivodeship (1921–1939)